Aşağı Qaramanlı (also, Ashaghy Garamanly, and Garamanly) is a village and municipality in the Neftchala District of Azerbaijan. It has a population of 1,810.

References 

Populated places in Neftchala District